Erin Cumpstone (born November 4, 1980) is a Canadian softball catcher, former ringette player, and currently a National Ringette League  coach for the Saskatchewan Heat. She began playing softball at age seven and studied at Simon Fraser University.

Sports

Softball 
Cumpstone was a part of the Canadian softball team who finished 9th at the 2002 World Softball Championships in Saskatoon and part of the Canadian softball team who finished 5th at the 2004 Summer Olympics.

Ringette 

Cumpstone was also a ringette player and a member of Team Canada 2010 during the 2010 World Ringette Championships where the team finished in second place to Finland. Cumpstone also competed in ringette at the 1999 Canada Winter Games and eventually played for one of the first teams in the National Ringette League, the Saskatoon Wild.

References

1980 births
Living people
Olympic softball players of Canada
Softball players at the 2004 Summer Olympics
Softball players at the 2008 Summer Olympics
Softball players at the 2011 Pan American Games
Sportspeople from Saskatoon
Simon Fraser University alumni
Canadian softball players
Ringette players
Pan American Games silver medalists for Canada
Pan American Games medalists in softball
Medalists at the 2011 Pan American Games
Canadian sportswomen